The 1957 Individual Speedway World Championship was the 12th edition of the official World Championship to determine the world champion rider.

The event was sponsored by the Sunday Dispatch and the attendance was 51,000. New Zealander Barry Briggs won the title after a ride off against defending champion Ove Fundin after the pair tied on 14 points after five rides each. In the ride off Fundin took the lead before Briggs forced his way to the front and with a lap to go Fundin lost control and crashed into the safety fence. Briggs duly won the £500 first prize with Fundin bruised but collecting £200. Peter Craven won the bronze and £100 after another ride off for third place.

Nordic Final
7 June 1957
 Oslo
 First 8 to European final

Continental Final
23 June 1957
 Vienna
 First 8 to European Final

British/Commonwealth Round

First qualifying final
24 August 1958
 Hyde Road (Manchester)
 First 5 to World final

Second qualifying final
24 August 1958
 Brandon Stadium (Coventry)
 First 5 to World final plus 1 reserve

European Final
7 July 1957
 Växjö
Ove Fundin seeded to World final
 First 5 to World final plus 1 reserve 

Note: Olle Nygren injured and replaced by Dan Forsberg in final

World final
21 September 1957
 London, Wembley Stadium

Classification

References

1957
Individual World Championship 
Individual Speedway World Championship 
Individual Speedway World Championship 
Speedway competitions in the United Kingdom